Brentwood Town Centre (sometimes abbreviated as Brentwood) is an elevated station on the Millennium Line of Metro Vancouver's SkyTrain rapid transit system. The station is located above Lougheed Highway east of Willingdon Avenue in Burnaby, British Columbia, Canada. The station is adjacent to the Amazing Brentwood, a mid-size shopping centre.

Structure and design
Brentwood Town Centre station is the only station in the system that is built on a median, with the entire station footprint located directly above a roadway. The station is also designed to serve as a pedestrian overpass across Lougheed Highway, which required the station platforms to be high above the roadway and a publicly accessible mezzanine/concourse to be built below the platform level. Only two other Millennium Line stations have this feature, Gilmore and Lougheed Town Centre stations.

The station is built using a combination of wood and steel, custom-designed to provide a curved appearance. The extensive use of glass for the outer wall makes the station glow at night.

On May 11, 2002, Perkins and Will Canada, designers of the station, were honoured for their work with a Governor General's Medal in Architecture.

In 2020, a $33-million program was announced which featured the rebuilding of the station's south entrance to improve accessibility and increase capacity in response to population growth in the area. The staircases were to be enclosed in glass and supplemented by a new elevator. Construction began on June 20, 2022, with a scheduled completion set for 2024.

Station information

Station layout

Entrances
North Entrance : A set of stairs and an elevator connecting the station concourse with the sidewalk on the north side of Lougheed Highway. A bus stop located directly in front of the entrance provides a drop-off for SkyTrain connections without the need to go to the bus loop.

North Entrance Mall/Bus Loop Access : Connects to the Amazing Brentwood shopping centre, bus loop, and the station with a long ramp and walkway. The walkway connects to the station at the north end of the concourse level, and it is completely covered and weather-protected.

South Entrance: Stair-only access connecting the station concourse with the sidewalk on the south side of Lougheed Highway. This entrance provides an alternate connection to various bus routes in the area.

Transit connections

Brentwood Town Centre station is a major regional connection point for bus routes serving north Burnarby, Metrotown, North Vancouver and New Westminster. It is also has a connection to the British Columbia Institute of Technology (BCIT).

Bus bay assignments are effective as of April 6, 2020. Bus bay assignments are as follows:

References

External links

Millennium Line stations
Railway stations in Canada opened in 2002
Buildings and structures in Burnaby
2002 establishments in British Columbia